The 1987 British National Track Championships were a series of track cycling competitions held from 31 July – 9 August 1987 at the Leicester Velodrome.

Medal summary

Men's Events

Women's Events

References

1987 in British sport
July 1987 sports events in the United Kingdom
August 1987 sports events in the United Kingdom